The 2022 Metro Atlantic Athletic Conference baseball tournament will be held from May 25 through 28. The top six regular season finishers of the league's eleven teams will meet in the double-elimination tournament to be held at Clover Stadium in Pomona, New York. The tournament champion will earn the conference's automatic bid to the 2022 NCAA Division I baseball tournament.

Seeding
The top six teams will be seeded one through four based on their conference winning percentage. They then play a double-elimination tournament.

Results

Schedule

References

Tournament
Metro Atlantic Athletic Conference Baseball Tournament
Metro Atlantic Athletic Conference baseball tournament